Nowy Zamek  is a village in the administrative district of Gmina Milicz, within Milicz County, Lower Silesian Voivodeship, in south-western Poland. Prior to 1945 it was in Germany. Its name in both Polish and German means new castle.

References

Nowy Zamek